Martín Varini Dizioli (born 2 August 1991) is a Uruguayan football manager and former player who played as a central defender. He is the current assistant manager of Brazilian club Cruzeiro.

Playing career
Born in Montevideo, Varini joined Defensor Sporting's youth setup in 2004, aged 13. He was promoted to the first team in 2011, and also took part of the 2012 U-20 Copa Libertadores Final against River Plate.

Varini moved to Italy in 2013 to join Italian side Varese, but the move did not materialize. Upon returning, he retired at the age of just 22.

Managerial career
After retiring, Varini graduated in business administration before returning to his former club Defensor in February 2017, as manager of the youth team. On 9 April 2021, at the age of just 29, he replaced Alejandro Cappuccio as manager of Primera División side Rentistas, and became the youngest manager of the 2021 Copa Libertadores.

Varini's managerial debut occurred on 21 April 2021, in a 1–1 Libertadores home draw against Racing Club. On 2 October, after only four wins in 25 matches, he left Rentistas on a mutual agreement.

Ahead of the 2022 season, Varini joined Paulo Pezzolano's staff at Brazilian club Cruzeiro, as his assistant.

References

External links

1991 births
Living people
Footballers from Montevideo
Uruguayan people of Italian descent
Uruguayan footballers
Association football defenders
Defensor Sporting players
Uruguay under-20 international footballers
Uruguayan football managers
C.A. Rentistas managers
Uruguayan expatriate sportspeople in Brazil